The 1966 Miami Redskins football team was an American football team that represented Miami University during the 1966 NCAA University Division football season. In their fourth season under head coach Bo Schembechler, the Redskins won the Mid-American Conference (MAC) championship, compiled a 9–1 record (5–1 against MAC opponents), and outscored all opponents by a combined total of 229 to 76.

The team's statistical leaders included quarterback Bruce Matte with 845 passing yards, Joe Kozar with 633 rushing yards, and John Erisman with 600 receiving yards.

Schedule

References

Miami
Miami RedHawks football seasons
Mid-American Conference football champion seasons
Miami Redskins football